Waar is a 2013 Pakistani action-thriller film directed by Bilal Lashari (in his feature directorial debut), written by Hassan Rana, and produced by Syed Mujtaba Tirmizi,  it stars Shaan Shahid as Major Mujtaba Rizvi, a retired Pakistan Army Officer, Meesha Shafi, Ali Azmat, Shamoon Abbasi, Ayesha Khan, and Kamran Lashari. The film follows Major Mujtaba Rizvi (Shahid), an officer, who returns from his retirement to save Pakistan from a major terrorist attack.

It is a stylized depiction of events surrounding Pakistan's efforts to conduct a war on terror on state-sponsored terror groups, which resulted in warfare among tribal units in North-West Pakistan. One incident included a terrorist attack on a Police Academy at Lahore in 2009. 

The film opened to positive reviews, and was Pakistan's highest anticipated film at that time. It is considered to be Pakistan's eleventh-highest-grossing movie of all time. A sequel titled, Waar 2 is in development.

Plot
Major Mujtaba Rizvi is a former Pakistan Army officer, who took an early retirement. The plot involves a counter-terrorism operation being conducted in the northwestern tribal region of Pakistan, led by Ehtesham Khattak (played by Hamza Ali Abbasi) and coordinated by his sister, Javeria Khattak (played by Ayesha Khan), an intelligence officer. Ehtesham and Javeria learn of a major terrorist attack that can only be countered with the help of Major Mujtaba.

Major Mujtaba's family was assassinated by Ramal (played by Shamoon Abbasi), an agent in India's spy agency Research and Analysis Wing (R&AW) . Major Mujtaba wants to take revenge on Ramal. Recognizing Ramal through his actions and tactics, Major Mujtaba is able to counter his attacks.

Mulla Siraj, a Taliban working with Ramal, is operating from a fort in the tribal area. He gives Ramal two bombs which Ramal is going to plant somewhere in Pakistan. Planned by Lax, a  spy; terrorists conduct an attack on a police training center to divert the attention of the security agencies. They have been watching any suspicious activity as they have learned that a major terrorist action is imminent. One bomb is loaded in a vehicle, which Ehtesham drives away in order to dispose the bomb. He is killed when the bomb explodes. The second bomb is planted in Jinnah Convention Centre, Islamabad but Major Mujtaba counters this attack and saves the country from another deadly terror incident. He takes his revenge by killing Ramal.

Cast 
 Shaan Shahid as Major Mujtaba Rizvi, a retired Pakistan Army Officer
 Shamoon Abbasi as Ramal, Indian spy agency Research and Analysis Wing's operative
 Meesha Shafi as Laxmi, Indian spy agency Research and Analysis Wing's operative
 Ali Azmat as Ejaz Khan, politician
 Hamza Ali Abbasi as Ehtesham Khattak, O/C Field Operations CTG
 Ayesha Khan as Javeria Khattak, an intelligence officer. Chief INTEL and COM; analyst CTG. and Ehtesham's sister
 Hassan Rana as Taha Ali, director CTG
 Bilal Lashari as Ali, sniper
 Kamran Lashari as Asher Azeem, DG Internal Security or Head of Security Wing
 Nadeem Abbas as Rana
 Batin Farooqi as Militant
 Uzma Khan as Mujtaba's wife
 Waseem Badami as a news anchor
 Naseer Afridi (cameo)

Production 
The title Waar is an Urdu language word meaning "to strike." Waar is primarily an English language film with some dialogue in Urdu. According to the producer, Hassan Waqas Rana, it was considered dubbing the movie in Urdu but the idea was dropped as it would have compromised the lead role played by Shaan Shahid. The story highlights the aspect of terrorism in Pakistan. It was written by Hassan Waqas Rana.

Casting and crew 
Initially, it was reported that Tom Delmar who has worked as stunt director in Hollywood movies would direct; later Lashari was chosen as the director who was working with Rana on another project. It is Bilal Lashari's debut as a director, who has directed music videos and assisted Shoaib Mansoor in the film Khuda Kay Liye. Ali Azmat and Meesha Shafi, who are known for singing, made their acting debut in the film. Originally Ali Azmat's and Ayesha Khan's roles were limited to guest appearance that were later expanded to full roles. Hamza Ali Abbasi, who intended to work as an assistant director, was later cast as an actor.

Filming 
The film is produced by MindWorks Media and includes 400 visual effects in which ICE Animation is one of the strongest VFX group and they won the award of Best VFX by Ary Awards . It took three years to complete Waar. Locations included Karachi (Pakistan), Rome (Italy), Istanbul (Turkey), Lahore (Pakistan), Islamabad, Swat Valley. It was reported in the media that the film was shot in collaboration with the Inter-Services Public Relations (ISPR), the media wing of Pakistan Army; director Bilal Lashari denied any such collaboration saying that the confusion might have arisen as MindWorks Media worked on the documentary The Glorious Resolve with ISPR when Waar was being filmed.

The budget was variously said to be PKR: 170 million and PKR: 200 million.

Release and promotion 
The release date was changed repeatedly and finally it was released on 16 October 2013 coinciding with Eid al-Adha in Pakistan. It was initially scheduled to release on 6 September 2013.

The first theatrical trailer of the movie was launched in January 2012 while the second in January 2013. One of the trailers was viewed more than 500,000 times the same month. Waar was dubbed as the most anticipated film in the history of the Pakistani cinema. When the film did not make it to screens in a considerable time after the release of trailers, the critics dubbed it as another project that will get shelved. Shamoon Abbasi, the main antagonist, cited the lack of resources for filming as one of the reasons for its delay.

The film premiered on 10 October at Karachi and on 14 October 2013 at Rawalpindi/Islamabad. Waar was given adults-only rating by the Sindh's provincial censor board for use of obscene language and violence. Waar was released in about forty five theaters across the country. The film was world TV premiered on 14 August 2014 on ARY Digital.

Though initially reported to be distributed by Warner Bros., it was distributed by ARY Films and Mandviwalla Entertainment.

The film was released in 25 countries. Waar was released in the United Arab Emirates (U.A.E.) cinemas on 12 December, where the movie actors graced the red carpet at the Grand Cinema, Wafi City. It was released in cinemas across the UK on 17 January 2014. The movie released in cinemas throughout Australia on 15 May 2014.

Home media 
Waar is streaming on Netflix.

Reception

Waar received positive reviews from critics and became the highest-grossing film in Pakistan of all time. Rafay Mahmood for The Express Tribune gave the movie three out of five stars and commended the cinematography, editing and sound design but viewed critically the story and some performances. According to the review, Waar is a "piece of pointless propaganda (and) is going to further confuse an already puzzled nation about Pakistan's outlook on counter-terrorism. In the long run, it will prove to be a great feature for Pakistani cinema but a damaging one for intellect."

Mohammad Kamran Jawaid of Dawn gave Waar a negative review, calling the screenplay a "codswallop of instances taped together to form narrative coherency". He also criticized the use of English, stating that "catering to the international market is one thing, but relying solely on it is either ignorance or arrogance". His review labels Waar as a "'showy' enterprise" where the "story, the plot, the resolve — in fact everything — hangs on a failing thread". Salman Khalid for Daily Times talks about the message given by the movie that highlights the "Pakistani perspective on the menace of terrorism", while acclaiming the story, direction, action sequences and individual performances. Rubban Shakeel of Skotato gave Waar 3.5/5 stars, calling it one of the best action films on Pakistan. On Skotato, too, Umer Ali called Waar "A Ray of Hope."

Because of the story, Waar has been critically reviewed in India, and received wider coverage than other Pakistani films. However, Indian film director Ram Gopal Varma praised the film, saying he was "stunned beyond belief" and congratulated Bilal Lashari.

Box office 
Waar opened on the first day of Eid al-Adha on 42 screens, the widest release ever, across Pakistan with 100% occupancy: It broke records with capacity audiences. It earned  in its first day, breaking the previous record of  held by Chennai Express. It earned  till Friday night, breaking all previous records of Eid collections. The film managed to collect  in its 4th week but was still behind Syed Noor's 1998 Choorian, which earned  and then on its 36th day of screening, it broke the record held by Choorian.

The movie had collected  in seven weeks. In its ninth week, the movie saw a huge competition in the form of Dhoom 3 but still added another . Waar continued its steady run in the following weeks and ended its run around  becoming the biggest grosser in Pakistan at that time, with worldwide collection . The domestic box office collection of was later broken by Dhoom 3 (released in December 2013) which grossed  in Pakistan.

Soundtrack 
The film's music, which took almost two years to get completed, was composed by Amir Munawar while Qayaas and Umair Jaswal have contributed a song each. Clinton Cerejo from Mumbai composed Saathi Salaam and Mauje Naina, which were first aired on Coke Studio India, Season 2. Music in Waar:

"Inquilaab" (Vocal: Umair Jaswal)
"Saathi Salaam" (Vocals: Sawan Khan Manganiyar and Clinton Cerejo)
"Mauje naina" (Vocals: Bianca Gomes, Shadab Faridi and Altamash Faridi)
"Halaak"
"Khayal"

Awards and nominations
Waar received 16 nominations at the first ARY Film Awards ultimately winning 13 awards, the highest for the ceremony.

Sequel 

On 7 December 2013 ARY Films and MindWorks Media joined for the production of Waar 2. Film will be shot in Pakistan, UK, Russia, Turkey and the former Yugoslavia and is expected to be released.

Controversy

Owner and CEO of Mindworks Media, Hassan Waqas Rana was booked under an FIR (First Information Report) with the Pakistani police by the director of Waar, Bilal Lashari for keeping its profits for himself. Apparently he transferred all cinema earnings to his personal account. The court dismissed Hassan's pre-arrest bail and police are searching the suspect in Lahore and Islamabad.

See also
 Cinema of Pakistan
 Lollywood
 List of highest-grossing Pakistani films
 List of Pakistani films of 2013

References

Additional references

External links 
 
 

Pakistani action thriller films
Pakistani action war films
English-language Pakistani films
2010s Urdu-language films
Insurgency in Khyber Pakhtunkhwa fiction
India–Pakistan relations in popular culture
Films about terrorism in Asia
Films set in Islamabad
Films set in Azad Kashmir
Films shot in Karachi
Films shot in Islamabad
Films shot in Lahore
Films shot in Istanbul
Films shot in Khyber Pakhtunkhwa
2013 directorial debut films
2013 films
MindWorks Media films
Pakistani spy thriller films
Films directed by Bilal Lashari
2010s action war films
Films about the Research and Analysis Wing
Kashmir conflict in films
Military of Pakistan in films